Bruno Habārovs (30 April 1939 – 29 August 1994) was a Latvian fencer. He competed for the Soviet Union in the individual and team épée at the 1960 and 1964 Olympics and won bronze medals in both events in 1960. Between 1959 and 1965 he won five épée medals at the world championships, including the individual gold in 1959.

References

External links
 

1939 births
1994 deaths
Latvian male épée fencers
Soviet male épée fencers
Olympic fencers of the Soviet Union
Fencers at the 1960 Summer Olympics
Fencers at the 1964 Summer Olympics
Olympic bronze medalists for the Soviet Union
Olympic medalists in fencing
Sportspeople from Riga
Medalists at the 1960 Summer Olympics
Universiade medalists in fencing
Universiade silver medalists for the Soviet Union
Honoured Masters of Sport of the USSR